Hermon Edgar Phillips (August 2, 1903 – February 16, 1986) was an American sprinter. He competed in the men's 400 metres at the 1928 Summer Olympics.

Athletic Career 
Herman ran at Butler University from 1925-1927 where he was the NCAA national champion in the 440-meter run. He wsa also the AAU champion in the 440 in 1927.

In the 1928 Summer Olympics in Amsterdam, he won his first round and quarter final heat of the 400m before finishing second in this semi-final and 6th in the final.

Phillips went on to coach track at Butler University from 1927-37 and founded the Butler Realys. He then coached at Purdue University from 1937-45.

References

1903 births
1986 deaths
Athletes (track and field) at the 1928 Summer Olympics
American male sprinters
Olympic track and field athletes of the United States
People from Rushville, Indiana
Track and field athletes from Indiana